Unplugging is a 2022 American comedy film directed by Debra Neil-Fisher, in her directorial debut, from a screenplay by Brad Morris and Matt Walsh. It stars Walsh, Eva Longoria, Lea Thompson, Keith David, Nicole Byer, and Al Madrigal. It was released on April 22, 2022, by Vertical Entertainment.

Premise
A family goes on a no-tech road trip to a remote mountain town.

Cast
 Matt Walsh as Dan Dewerson
 Eva Longoria as Jeanine Dewerson
 Lea Thompson as Brenda Perkins
 Keith David as T-Bone
 Nicole Byer as Officer Dunn
 Al Madrigal as Juan
 Johnny Pemberton as Tim
 Hala Finley as Elizabeth “Blizzard” Dewerson
 Morgan Walsh as Florence
 Emmett Walsh as Carlito
 Pat Walsh as Frank

Production
In May 2019, it was announced Matt Walsh and Isla Fisher had joined the cast of the film, with Debra Neil-Fisher making her directorial debut, from a screenplay by Walsh and Brad Morris, with Walsh and Morris set to produce the film. In October 2020, Eva Longoria, Lea Thompson, Keith David, Nicole Byer, and Al Madrigal joined the cast of the film, with Longoria replacing Fisher.

Principal photography began in October 2020. The film was shot in various locations in Oklahoma in the USA, including Tulsa.

Release
Unplugging was released on April 22, 2022 by Vertical Entertainment.

Reception
In the United States and Canada, the film earned an estimated $20,500 from 101 theaters in its opening weekend.

On the review aggregator website Rotten Tomatoes, 14% of 14 reviews are positive, with an average rating of 3.8/10.

References

External links
 
 

2022 comedy films
American comedy films
2022 directorial debut films
Films shot in Oklahoma
Vertical Entertainment films
2020s English-language films
2020s American films